Durhamville is a hamlet located in Oneida County, New York, United States. The population was 584 as of the 2010 census.

The Hamlet of Durhamville is in the southern part of the county and is approximately 1.75 miles north of Oneida on Route 46.

History 
Durhamville is a small hamlet that was founded before 1813 and named for Eber Durham.

From the mid-1800s until the early 1900s, Durhamville was home to Erie Canal barge construction and repair.  In particular, it was home to an Erie Canal lock which was abandoned when the route of the canal was changed.  It was also the location of the Fox & Company glass house which, at the time, was one of the largest glass companies in the nation.

Geography
Durhamville is located at  (43.1206241, -75.6710161).

References

Hamlets in New York (state)
Census-designated places in Oneida County, New York
Erie Canal
Census-designated places in New York (state)
Hamlets in Oneida County, New York